Diego Jussani (born 7 September 1987) is a Brazilian footballer who plays for Oeste as a defender.

Club career
Born in Americana, São Paulo, Jussani started his senior professional career with Brasilis before moving to Ponte Preta in 2010. After having spent two seasons with the club, he moved to Bahia on 19 May 2011. His output in the 2011 season was his two appearances in the national league besides featuring for the under-23 team. On 27 December, he signed a contract extension, keeping him at the club for the 2012 season. On 18 January 2012, he made his Baiano debut against Alagoinhas in a 3–3 draw.

After being released by Bahia, Jussani signed with Joinville on 17 May 2012. In December 2013, he moved to São Bernardo. In the following summer, he signed with ABC Futebol Clube. On 7 July, he scored his first goal in a 1–1 draw against Globo.

In May 2015, Jussani moved to CRB. He contributed with six goals in 62 matches, as his club won the Alagoano in 2015 and 2016. After a stint with Guarani, he signed with Fortaleza on 20 December 2017.

On 26 December 2018, Jussani joined América Mineiro for the upcoming season. Only two games into the Série B season, and having been captain and first choice for América, he signed until the end of 2019 with Vila Nova.

References

External links

1987 births
Living people
Association football defenders
Brazilian footballers
Associação Atlética Ponte Preta players
Esporte Clube Bahia players
Joinville Esporte Clube players
São Bernardo Futebol Clube players
ABC Futebol Clube players
Clube de Regatas Brasil players
Guarani FC players
Fortaleza Esporte Clube players
América Futebol Clube (MG) players
Vila Nova Futebol Clube players
Esporte Clube XV de Novembro (Piracicaba) players
Associação Portuguesa de Desportos players
Oeste Futebol Clube players
Campeonato Brasileiro Série A players
Campeonato Brasileiro Série B players
Campeonato Brasileiro Série D players
People from Americana, São Paulo
Footballers from São Paulo (state)